Víctor Manuel Alejandro Martínez Ruiz (born 1982) is a Guatemalan economist and politician who was Minister of Public Finance of Guatemala. He currently is the First Councilor of Guatemala City.

References

Living people
Finance ministers of Guatemala
Guatemalan economists
Government ministers of Guatemala
1982 births
Unionist Party (Guatemala) politicians